Fosa Juniors FC is a Malagasy football club based in Mahajanga.

Achievements
THB Champions League : 1
 2019.

Coupe de Madagascar : 2
 2017, 2019.

Super Coupe de Madagascar : 0

Performance in CAF competitions
CAF Confederation Cup: (2018) - 3 tours
2018 – Play off Round

References

External links
Facebook page

Football clubs in Madagascar